s-Graveland is a village in the Dutch province of North Holland. It is a part of the municipality of Wijdemeren, and lies about 4 km northwest of Hilversum.
The former municipality of 's-Graveland merged with Loosdrecht and Nederhorst den Berg on 1 January 2002 to form the new municipality Wijdemeren.

The village was first mentioned in 1634 as "de akkers in 's Graevenlandt", and means "the land of the Count (of Holland)". The area was property of the count until the early 16th century when it was cultivated.

Estates
Since the seventeenth century,'s-Graveland was a popular location for wealthy families from Amsterdam, who bought, built or inherited villas and estates there, like:
 Bantam,
 Boekesteyn,
 Gooilust,
 Hilverbeek aan de Leeuwenlaan,
 Land en Bosch,
 Schaep en Burgh,
 Schoonoord,
 Spanderswoud,
 Sperwershof,
 Spiegelrust,
 Swaenenburgh,
 Trompenburgh, built by Cornelis Tromp, in loan by the Rijksmuseum in Amsterdam.

The 's-Gravelandsevaart or 's-Gravelands canal ('vaart' is a passage for boats, 'varen' means to sail in Dutch), where most of the homes were built, used to be a major connection between Amsterdam and Hilversum. Transport per ship was often preferred over carriage, because the roads were not paved.

In the year 1672 the French caused a lot of damage, destroying homes and killing inhabitants. In 1673 the French abandoned the area again, and many homes were rebuilt, new gardens were added in French fashion.

Notable people
 Gustav Leonhardt (1928–2012), Dutch keyboard player, conductor, musicologist, teacher and editor
 Tjalling Koopmans (1910–1985), Dutch-American mathematician and economist and winner of the 1975 Nobel Memorial Prize in Economic Sciences

References

Municipalities of the Netherlands disestablished in 2002
Populated places in North Holland
Former municipalities of North Holland
Wijdemeren